The following is a list of cultural entities with sole naming rights:

Awards

Art awards
 BP Portrait Award, BP

Literary awards
 Rogers Writers' Trust Fiction Prize, Rogers Communications.  Formerly the Writers' Trust Fiction Prize.
 Scotiabank Giller Prize, Bank of Nova Scotia.  Formerly the Giller Prize.

Music awards
 High1 Seoul Music Awards, Kangwon Land.
 UnionPay Artist of the Year (Mnet Asian Music Awards), China UnionPay.

Scientific awards
 Sveriges Riksbank Prize in Economic Sciences in Memory of Alfred Nobel, Swedish National Bank.

Sporting awards
 Bud Light Plus-Minus Award, Anheuser-Busch.

Museums

Canada

Performing arts venues

Argentina

Canada

Chile

Japan

Mexico

Philippines

South Korea

United States

Sports

References

See also
 Corporate sponsorship
 Naming rights

Business-related lists
Cultural lists
Brand management